Monaco competed at the 2018 Winter Olympics in Pyeongchang, South Korea, from 9 to 25 February 2018. The official team was unveiled on January 24, 2018. The Monegasque team consisted of four athletes competing in two sports: alpine skiing and bobsleigh.

At the team unveiling ceremony Prince Albert also unveiled Rudy Rinaldi, the driver of the Monaco bobsled team, as the country's flag bearer at the 2018 Winter Olympics opening ceremony.

Competitors
The following is the list of number of competitors participating in the Monegasque delegation per sport.

Alpine skiing 

Monaco qualified two athletes, one male and one female.

Bobsleigh 

Based on their rankings in the 2017–18 Bobsleigh World Cup, Monaco qualified 1 sled.

* – Denotes the driver of each sled

See also
Monaco at the 2018 Summer Youth Olympics

References

Nations at the 2018 Winter Olympics
2018
2018 in Monégasque sport